Dean Brennan (born 17 June 1980) is an Irish former footballer and manager. He is currently the head coach of Barnet.

Career
Brennan began his footballing career at Sheffield Wednesday but despite impressing at youth and reserve levels, he never made a first team appearance for the Owls. After being released by Wednesday in the summer of 2000, Brennan returned home to Ireland and went on trial at Bohemians. He made two appearances for the club in the FAI Super Cup but manager Roddy Collins decided not to sign the midfielder.

Brennan then went on trial at Luton Town and this time was more successful, earning a two-year contract at Kenilworth Road. He made his debut for the club in a 2–1 defeat at Wigan Athletic soon after. However, he never became a regular first team choice and in 2002 moved to Hitchin Town.

Luton would prove to be his last taste of League football as he drifted around the non-League scene with spells at Stevenage, Grays Athletic, Lewes, AFC Wimbledon, Cambridge City, Chesham United and Hemel Hempstead Town in the following years. In his brief spell with Wimbledon he earned the nickname "the Irish Beckham", a reference to his high quality crossing ability. While at Grays he helped them win the 2004–05 FA Trophy.

In August 2009, Brennan signed for Spartan South Midlands Football League Premier Division side Aylesbury. In 2010, he rejoined Hemel Hempstead Town, and in March after the sacking of manager Gary Phillips, he was appointed as caretaker manager at the age of just 29.

Brennan began a second spell with Dunstable Town at the start of the 2011–12 season. He joined as player/coach and managed the team in cup ties. In May 2012 he rejoined Hemel Hempstead Town this time as manager. He helped the Tudors to their highest ever finish (fourth in Southern League Premier Division) this meant that they had qualified for the playoffs. They reached the final against Gosport Borough, where they drew 2–2 which sent the game to penalties which was lost 5–4.

The following season saw promotion to the Conference South, after winning the Southern Premier League by 10 clear points.

After a disastrous start to their first season in the Conference South league, Hemel improved and eventually finished in a creditable 9th position, also reaching the First Round of the FA Cup where they lost at Bury 3–1.

The 2015–16 National League South season saw Brennan's Hemel narrowly miss out on the playoffs as Whitehawk pipped them on the final day to fifth place.

On 18 September 2018, Brennan and his assistant Stuart Maynard were appointed by team owner Glenn Tamplin as the managerial team at National League South side Billericay Town. However, they both had their contracts terminated by Tamplin after less than four months in the job on Wednesday 16 January 2019.

On 12 February 2019, Brennan was named as the new manager of Isthmian League Premier Division side Kingstonian. Stuart Maynard was also confirmed as the club's new assistant manager. However, on 16 March 2019, following a breakdown in relations with a club director over player liaison and team strategy, Brennan and Maynard re-evaluated their position and resigned after just five games in charge.

On 21 May 2019, Brennan was named as the new manager of National League South side Wealdstone, with Stuart Maynard as his assistant manager. In the shortened 2019-20 season, Brennan led the club to automatic promotion to the National League, as champions of the National League South. In December 2020, he turned down an approach from Barnet F.C. to be their manager. On 2 February 2021, Brennan resigned from his role at Wealdstone, with Maynard remaining at the club.

Barnet
On 10 June 2021, Brennan joined National League side Barnet in the Head of Football role with Harry Kewell taking on the role of Head Coach.

On 20 September 2021, after Harry Kewell (former Head Coach) was dismissed from Barnet F.C. as Head Coach after having lost five and drawn two his seven games, Brennan was appointed as Caretaker Head Coach of the club. On 17 February 2022, Brennan stepped back from his role of Head of Football instead becoming Head Coach on a permanent basis.

The 2022–23 season saw Barnet in the play-off picture, ending 2022 in fifth position with Brennan being awarded with the National League Manager of the Month award for December and a new contract until 2026.

Managerial statistics

References

External links

Living people
Sheffield Wednesday F.C. players
Bohemian F.C. players
Luton Town F.C. players
Grays Athletic F.C. players
Stevenage F.C. players
AFC Wimbledon players
Lewes F.C. players
Chesham United F.C. players
Cambridge City F.C. players
Hitchin Town F.C. players
Corby Town F.C. players
Halesowen Town F.C. players
Hemel Hempstead Town F.C. players
Republic of Ireland association footballers
League of Ireland players
English Football League players
Northern Football League players
Isthmian League players
Southern Football League players
1980 births
Hendon F.C. players
Aylesbury F.C. players
Barton Rovers F.C. players
Dunstable Town F.C. players
English football managers
Hemel Hempstead Town F.C. managers
Billericay Town F.C. managers
Kingstonian F.C. managers
Wealdstone F.C. managers
Barnet F.C. managers
Barnet F.C. non-playing staff
Association football midfielders
Republic of Ireland expatriate association footballers
Expatriate footballers in England